The 2014–15 Stephen F. Austin Ladyjacks basketball team represented Stephen F. Austin University during the 2014–15 NCAA Division I women's basketball season. The Ladyjacks were led by fifth year head coach Brandon Schneider and played their home games at the William R. Johnson Coliseum. They are members of the Southland Conference.  Winning the Southland Conference regular season championship, the Ladyjacks had an overall record of 23–8 and a conference record of 16–2.  After losing the SLC tournament championship game to the Northwestern State Lady Demons, the Ladyjacks were an automatic qualifier to the 2015 Women's National Invitation Tournament where they met the TCU Horned Frogs.  The season ended with an 80–85 first round loss to the Horned Frogs in Fort Worth, TX.

Roster

Schedule

|-
!colspan=9 style="background:#5F259F; color:#FFFFFF;"| Non-conference Schedule

|-
!colspan=9 style="background:#5F259F; color:#FFFFFF;"| Southland Conference Schedule

|-
!colspan=9 style="background:#5F259F; color:#FFFFFF;"| Southland Conference Tournament

|-
!colspan=9 style="background:#5F259F; color:#FFFFFF;"| Women's National Invitation Tournament (WNIT)

Source:

See also
2014–15 Stephen F. Austin Lumberjacks basketball team

References

Stephen F. Austin Ladyjacks basketball seasons
Stephen F. Austin
Stephen F. Austin Ladyjacks basketball
Stephen F. Austin Ladyjacks basketball